Cliniodes additalis is a moth in the family Crambidae. It was described by James E. Hayden in 2011. It is found in Mexico, where it has been recorded from San Luis Potosí.

The length of the forewings is about 14 mm. The forewing costa, basal and medial areas are brown. The medial area has some rust red scales. The postmedial and terminal areas are filled with reddish brown. The hindwings are translucent white, with a black marginal band. Adults have been recorded on wing in June.

Etymology
The species name is derived from Latin additus (meaning added).

References

Moths described in 2011
Eurrhypini